The County class was a class of British guided missile destroyers, the first such warships built by the Royal Navy. Designed specifically around the Seaslug anti-aircraft missile system, the primary role of these ships was area air defence around the aircraft carrier task force in the nuclear-war environment.

Eight ships were built and entered service. Two served in the British naval task force in the Falklands War in 1982. After leaving British service, four ships were sold to the Chilean Navy and one to the Pakistan Navy.

Design and development
A class of ten ships was envisaged in 1958 for about £6–7.5 million each, equivalent to a costed Programme for four large, Seaslug-armed, 15,000-ton cruisers, estimated at £14 million each, based on an upgraded Minotaur-class cruiser (1951), approved for full design in early 1955. The final four County-class ships, with hull numbers 07 to 10, were delayed in 1960 while an anti-submarine escort carrier was considered. Hulls 07 and 08 were approved in 1963 as a temporary stopgap, and the ninth and tenth hulls were cancelled.

The class was designed as a hybrid cruiser-destroyer, with dimensions  -similar to the legend of the broad beam Mk 3 Korean war emergency 1951 Dido-class cruiser. Vastly larger than previous RN destroyers, its predecessor, the 2800 ton light , the  Daring class being declared a new  'Daring' category of super destroyer by PM Winston Churchill in 1952. Both Churchill and Admiral Andrew Cunningham saw in 1944 at the inception of the Battle/ Daring Destroyers that the destroyer and light cruiser categories should merge with displacement of around 3500 ton light required for effective first class anti-aircraft and anti-submarine escorts. The new County class would be destroyer leaders for aircraft carrier task forces and, East of Suez, also  play a traditional cruiser, flagship role with capability for GFS and destruction of enemy warships and shipping. In 1955 the new First Sea Lord Louis Mountbatten specified the development of an April 1955, 4800 ton Fast fleet escort design (DNC 7/959) as a Seaslug carrying vessel with a Y stern positioned twin 3/70 AA mount replaced by Seaslug (DNC 7/1002) as an alternative to the approved  large GW 58A 15,400 ton cruiser which would have combined Seaslug with Type 984 3D radar and a conventional Tiger-class gun armament. During 1956–1958 a full "alternative" gun armament was an option for the new GW Fast Escort, based on a modern combined gas turbine and steam turbine (COSAG) propulsion unit, as enlarged Daring fleet escorts, armed with two twin Mk 6 4.5-inch guns, two twin L/70 40mm Bofors and a twin 3-inch/70 guns.

A revised design in March 1958 added Seaslug and Seacat missiles and added a telescopic hangar. Mountbatten staged an impressive demonstration shoot for flag officers and politicians: the Seaslug test ship HMS Girdle Ness launched ten successive Seaslugs, including a salvo of two Seaslugs together. The success included hits in the lethal zone of two piston-engine Fairey Firefly radio-controlled drones, at  undemanding targets with a speed of only 315-375 mph. This apparent success enabled the Minister of Defence Duncan Sandys to gain the approval of the Cabinet Defence Committee for Seaslug production to be approved in 1958.

While the missile worked against Second World War-era level flying targets, the beam guidance system was dubious at range and in rough water which meant eight fixed stabilisers were added to the design of the County-class. Advocacy for the guided missiles fit was led by Mountbatten and the Cabinet agreed with using the system, despite staff reports over missile unreliability and inaccuracy, confirmed by the dismal performance in the following 1959 Seaslug target launches at Woomera in South Australia. Many Royal Australian Navy officers felt Seaslug was unsuitable for the RAN.

Final revisions to the design in 1958 were to adopt a high flush deck from B turret, increasing internal space, the cancellation of the nuclear-tipped Seaslug, and provision for folding fins for the Seaslug, all allowing storage of 20 extra missile bodies for rapid assembly. Against staff advice, a tight fitting, fixed side-hangar for the anti-submarine Westland Wessex helicopter was added on the insistence of the First Sea Lord. While a flawed layout, it proved usable when tested in the Falklands War in 1982.

Lord Mountbatten classified the  County-class as guided missile destroyers to gain Treasury and political support with cruisers discredited in the media as colonial relics, obsolete gunships like battleships. The Royal Navy staff and officers regarded the County class as cruisers  and to signify they were major surface units they were named after, the lead unit of each variant of the RN most powerful interwar and Second World War cruisers including the predecessor County-class heavy cruisers and significant First World War armoured cruisers. They were however less than real cruisers,  unarmoured and fitted to destroyer standards, except for staff accommodation and a dated, short ranged, semi automatic, 4.5 destroyer armament given additional spotting radar. They did provide space and weight for light Bofors and Oerlikons to be fitted, if required, as post Falklands. The apparently impressive performance of Seaslug against jet Gloster Meteor UC15 drones, giving the Royal Navy a good number of impressive County-class 'destroyers' and a greater number of ship commands and posts for ambitious officers.

While short on the support and logistic spares stocks of a traditional cruiser, they were  envisaged by the Director of Naval Construction as being 'probably' used in the cruiser role with space for Flag staff offices, and admiral's barge accommodation in the 1960s: the last decade when the UK oversaw significant colonial territory ("East of Suez"). Its missile capability had been overtaken by aircraft development by 1962–63, when HMS Devonshire and Hampshire entered service, but in the early and mid-1960s the modern lines of these guided-missile destroyers, with their traditional RN cruiser style and their impressive-looking missiles, enabled the overstretched Royal Navy to project sufficient power to close down the threat of a militant, left-leaning Indonesia to Malaysia and Borneo during the Indonesia-Malaysia confrontation.

Design features

The County class was designed around the GWS1 Seaslug beam riding anti-aircraft missile system. Seaslug was a first-generation surface-to-air missile intended to hit high-flying nuclear-armed bombers and shadowing surveillance aircraft like the Tupolev Tu-16 "Badger" and Tupolev Tu-95 "Bear", which could direct strikes against the British fleet from missile destroyers and cruise missile-armed submarines. In 1956 during the first integrated trials of Sea Slug  on HMS Girdle Ness, UK Parliament committees, the Royal Navy Sea Lords and September 1956 Reports by Deputy CAS and Ministry of Supply to RAF CAS, considered, cancelling Seaslug. The RAF found Seaslug, could not cover, low and high level targets and, only marginally capable on  subsonic targets at  3-10 miles and height of 1-7 miles, and not effective against modern, V Bomber, Canberra and Soviet Il 28 type, likely to be used in a 1956 Suez confrontation. The missile was obsolete in many Admirals and MPs view  compared the USN Terrier and RAF Bloodhound and Army Thunderbird semi active homing missiles in service by 1958, CNS, First Sea Lord, Earl Mountbatten and Controller Vice Admiral Reid, saw it as 'deplorable' Sea Slug was so far behind, due to the lack of engineers and higher priority for Korea, the RAF and Army but essential to Royal Navy and UK credibility and independence to redouble the effort and continue with Sea Slug. A new British missile or adoption of the USN, Terrier Mk11 or British Army, Thunderbird, would take too long. The improved Mk2 version of Seaslug had 10,000 ft (3000m) greater altitude and speed.

The Seaslug system was a large weapon. The missiles were stowed horizontally in a long unarmoured magazine which was sited above the waterline and took up a great deal of internal space. The risk of fire near the magazine was checked by an automatic sprinkler system. In order to increase the number of missiles that could be carried, on the last four ships, some of the missiles were stored partly disassembled in the forward end of the magazine. Their wings and fins would be reattached before being moved into the aft sections of the handling spaces and eventually loaded onto the large twin launcher for firing.

The limitations of the beam riding guidance method and lack of a homing head, meant the Mk 1 and 2 Seaslug were intended to have nuclear variants - the much larger blast compensating for lack of accuracy. However nuclear warhead for Mk 1 Seaslug (for the first group of ships) was dropped as it needed extra crew, space and security which were not available on the smaller hull; development of the nuclear warhead for Seaslug on the second group of ships was cancelled in June 1962, to reduce the naval budget, and the RNs requirement below 334 tactical nuclear warheads.

The County-class and the Seaslug missile were interim solutions and the new Sea Dart anti-aircraft missile would have speed and accuracy to ensure a hit without requiring a nuclear warhead. First Lord Mountbatten doubted the usefulness of tactical nuclear weapons by 1962, due to escalation theories, scientific advice and greater evidence of fallout consequences, leading to the Partial Nuclear Test Ban Treaty in 1963. There were also staff and space difficulties with carrying nuclear warheads on confined destroyers. As early as 1952, Air Chief Marshal John Slessor (Chief of the Air Staff) the most influential defence Advisor to Winston Churchill considered the Navy irrelevant in a nuclear war, he first defined, the role of RN was "uncertain"  as a pretext to maintain a large fleet and required only for political reasons.  The collapse of the 1956 Suez operation and the huge impact of the British hydrogen bomb tests in 1954-57 led to the 1957 review of Britain's defences, reliance on nuclear deterrence by strategic aircraft, missiles and missile submarines and doubt that a nuclear war would last long enough to require trans-Atlantic convoys. And corresponding doubt whether major conventional war was still possible on the basis of the last 1954-5 HC speeches of Churchill and Eisenhower, justified large cutbacks of British and American large ship, destroyer and carrier programme and the future role and relevance of the Royal Navy was "unclear" moving the RN to more limited, East of Suez task forces, with gun and Seaslug- and Seacat-armed destroyers escorting medium British aircraft carriers with only a limited nuclear strike capacity against ships and cities equipped with Blackburn Buccaneer S.1 (and then the improved S.2) strike aircraft mainly aimed to deter regional powers such as Indonesia Early versions of the equivalent US missile system RIM-2 Terrier, like Seaslug, relied on beam riding and needed a nuclear warhead variant to compensate for inaccuracy at low level and range. However, by 1962, the US was concentrating on the medium range radar guided RIM-24 Tartar and long range RIM-8 Talos, which had success against long range North Vietnamese aircraft from 1968. The Royal Air Force's semi-active land-based Bristol Bloodhound was unrelated to Seaslug development, but drew top scientists away from RN work.

The County-class design attempted to give maximum protection from nuclear fallout, with the operation rooms, where the ship was fought, located 5 decks below, deep in the ship, with a lift from the bridge, which maintained some duplicated command systems. The operations room, sited the main radar, sonar, electronic warfare screens and communication data and computer links.  The electronics required for the Seaslug were the large Type 901 fire-control radar and the Type 965 air-search radar. These required a great deal of weight to be carried high up on the ship, further affecting ship layout. Although superior the Type 984 radar  was rejected as it was even heavier and excluded a twin turret 4.5-inch armament forward which was needed for gunfire support or action against surface vessels. It was hoped RN carriers with Type 984 would provide primary air target for the destroyers through a datalink. According to a RN Naval architect, "Sea Slug did not live up to expectations" and was obsolete by 1957. The compromises required by the heavy and dated Seaslug system detracted from the success and popularity of an otherwise advanced ship design. Its ineffectiveness and vulnerable magazine and missile fuel, reduced confidence in the class, which had potential as command ships, having good seaworthiness, speed and in the group two County class a spacious operations room with ADAWS.

In 1960, because US-designed missiles were seen at the time to be superior to the Seaslug, the Royal Australian Navy (RAN) proposed a variation of the County-class armed with the US Tartar missile and two additional modifications: hangar space for three Westland Wessex helicopters and a steam propulsion system, rather than the combined steam and gas system used in the County class. Two different reasons have been put forward for the Australian decision: according to an Australian history, British authorities would not allow a steam-propelled variant of the county, whereas, according to a British account, the re-design required to accommodate the Tartar missile would have taken longer than the RAN was prepared to accept.

The US Terrier missile had some support amongst the RN staff, but consideration was not given to acquiring it for the second batch of four ships, as the County class were "shop windows" for advanced UK technology, and it was vital for the British missile and aerospace industry to continue the Sea Slug project, to allow the development of the much improved Sea Dart missile.  Following problems with the original version, a reworked Action Data Automation Weapon System (ADAWS) was successfully trialled on HMS Norfolk in 1970. In the mid-1960s the County-class destroyers were assets; their impressive appearance and data links, feeding off the carriers' Type 984 radar, projected effective capability during the Indonesia–Malaysia confrontation. The Mark 1 Seaslug was operationally reliable and proved useful as a missile target for the new Sea Dart missiles in the late 1970s and early 1980s; the supersonic Mark 2 version proved less effective for this. There are questions as to whether it was ever fully operational and there were problems with missiles breaking up when the boosters separated. Inaccuracy, primitive beam-riding guidance and lack of infrared homing or a proximity fuze in the Mk 1 made it of limited value. Short-range air defence was provided by the GWS-22 Seacat anti-aircraft missile system, which made the Counties the first Royal Navy warships to be armed with two different types of guided missile.

Batch 2 improvements

The second four Counties had improved air warning and target indicator radar ("double bedstead" 965M and a revised 992 for closer range tracking rather than only surface warning). The revised Seaslug Mk2 was supposedly effective against supersonic and surface targets at up to 30 km. ADWAS command and control system could process and prioritise air targets detected by the 965 and 992 radar and other so fitted RN warships. This was important as the Type 984 3D processing system on the carriers Victorious, Hermes and Eagle were removed from 1967 to 1972, affecting the first four County class ships which depended on datalinks to the carrier systems for primary radar and targeting processing of Seaslug.

As constructed, the County-class ships were armed with a pair of twin QF 4.5-inch gun mountings. These had magazines for 225 shells for each gun, two-thirds of the magazine capacity for the same guns in the single-turreted Leander-class frigates. The second batch of four ships (Antrim, Fife, Glamorgan and Norfolk) were refitted in the mid-1970s – their 'B' turrets were removed and replaced by four single MM38 Exocet surface-to-surface anti-ship-missile launcher boxes in order to increase the fleets anti-ship capability following retirement of its aircraft carriers. This made the County-class ships the only Royal Navy ships to be fitted with three separate types of guided missile: Seaslug, Seacat and Exocet.

Possible development
It was suggested by Vosper Thornycroft that the Counties could have been developed for the anti-submarine role by replacing the Seaslug system with a larger hangar and flight deck and the possibility of removing Seaslug and rebuilding the missile tunnel as storage for extra Westland Lynx helicopters. Certainly, these arrangements as originally installed to operate a single Westland Wessex anti-submarine helicopter were problematic, with a hangar so cramped it took an hour to get the aircraft either in or out again, during which the port Seacat launcher was unusable. However it was determined that beam-restrictions would still limit the Counties' helicopter operation in RN service to the obsolescent Wessex, as they were too narrow to handle the far more capable British-built Sea King HAS. The Chilean navy, however, did convert two of the four ships they purchased along these lines.

Ships of the class
Eight vessels were built in two batches between 1959 and 1970, the later four vessels carrying the improved Seaslug GWS2 and updated electronics requiring rearranged mastheads. The major identifying feature was the Batch 2 vessels' prominent "double-bedstead" AKE-2 antennas of the Type 965 air-search radar, and their taller foremast carrying the Type 992Q low-angle search radar.

Ships' names

Four of the "Counties" had names which had been used by the famous interwar s: London, Norfolk, Devonshire and Kent. (The last of that class, had survived until 1959 as a trials ship). Devonshire, Hampshire and Antrim had been the names of   armoured cruisers of the First World War.

Four of the new ships were named after counties containing a Royal Navy Dockyard: Devonshire (Devonport Dockyard), Hampshire (Portsmouth Dockyard), Kent (Chatham Dockyard), and Fife (Rosyth dockyard). Glamorgan and Antrim are the counties in Wales and Northern Ireland which contain the port cities and regional capitals of Cardiff and Belfast (by analogy to London, England). Norfolk is the county of Nelson's birth, and the important 19th-century ports of Great Yarmouth and King's Lynn.

Three of the ships' names have been subsequently re-used:  was a Type 22 frigate.  HMS Kent and HMS Norfolk were used for RN Type 23 frigates though in their case after British dukedoms.

Service

1982 Falklands War

Antrim and Glamorgan both served in the Falklands War; Antrim was the flagship of Operation Paraquet, the recovery of South Georgia in April 1982. Her helicopter, a Westland Wessex HAS Mk 3 (nicknamed "Humphrey") was responsible for the rescue of 16 Special Air Service operators from Fortuna Glacier and the subsequent detection and disabling of the Argentinian submarine Santa Fe. In San Carlos Water, Antrim was hit by a 1,000 lb (450 kg) bomb which failed to explode. Glamorgan, after many days on the "gun line" bombarding Port Stanley airfield, was hit by an Exocet launched from land at the end of the conflict. It destroyed her aircraft hangar and the port Seacat mounting. Her Navigating Officer's prompt reaction to visual detection of the Exocet narrowly averted a hit on the fatally vulnerable Seaslug magazine, by turning the ship so as to give as small a target as possible (the stern) to the incoming weapon. The ship suffered fourteen deaths, injuries, and was lucky to survive with extensive damage and flooding. Had the missile hit a few inches lower, the above waterline magazine would have blown in an explosive fireball and many more of the crew might have been lost.

Disposal
All eight of the class had short Royal Navy careers, serving on average less than 16 years. Only London of the first batch would serve further (transferred to Pakistan) while the other three Batch 1 ships were decommissioned by 1980 with Hampshire being immediately scrapped in 1977 after cannibalization for spares, and Devonshire sunk in weapons testing in 1984. Kent would serve as a floating (though immobile) accommodation and training ship in Portsmouth harbour until 1996.  The four ships of Batch 2 however would be operated for 16 to 23 more years after sale to the Chilean Navy, in which they all received extensive upgrades and modernisation.

Construction programme
The ships were built at the major UK yards, with some of the machinery coming from Associated Electrical Industries of Manchester, Parsons Marine Steam Turbine Company of Wallsend-on-Tyne, John I. Thornycroft & Company of Southampton, Yarrows of Glasgow, and the Wallsend Slipway and Engineering Company, Wallsend-on-Tyne.

Costs

Running costs

Cost of major refits

Notes

Sources
 
 
 
 
 

 
 
 
 Purvis, M.K.,  'Post War RN Frigate and Guided Missile Destroyer Design 1944-1969', Transactions, Royal Institution of Naval Architects (RINA), 1974

Further reading

 Marriott, Leo: Royal Navy Destroyers since 1945, Ian Allan Ltd, 1989
 McCart, Neil, 2014. County Class Guided Missile Destroyers, Maritime Books.

External links

http://www.countyclassdestroyers.co.uk

Destroyer classes
County-class destroyers
County-class destroyers of the Royal Navy
Ship classes of the Royal Navy